Shangbigno Pakhikul O Kolkata Bishayak (Anxious Feathers and Thematic Kolkata) is the debut album by the Bengali rock band Moheener Ghoraguli. It was released in 1977 by Gathani Records. It was recorded at a local studio in Kolkata during their formation period from 1976 to 1977. The band at the time consisted of Gautam Chattopadhyay (vocals, lead guitar, saxophone), Biswanath Chattopadhyay (drums, bass, violin), Pradip Chatterjee (bass, flute), Ranjon Ghoshal (emcee, visuals, media relations), Abraham Mazumdar (vocals, piano, violin), Tapas Das (vocals, guitar), Tapesh Bandopadhyay (vocals, guitar). Gautam also served as the band's primary songwriter, though he contributed only one track on the album credited to the band collectively and other tracks were written by Ranjon, Tapas and Tapesh.

The album takes a city name Kolkata, the capital of the Indian state of West Bengal, and featuring artwork of moonlit night sketch of the city designed by Ranjon, Sarmistha Chatterjee and Sangeeta Ghoshal.

Two of its songs, "Shangbigno Pakhikul" and "Haay, Bhalobasi" remade and reissue in their collaborative albums Jhora Somoyer Gaan (1996) and Maya (1997) respectively. Where "Haay, Bhalobasi" became long-term mainstays of the band's live setlist. Since its release, the album has been hailed as a baul-jazz album in the Bengali music scene.

Release
The album was released as an Extended play (EP) 7-inch 45-rpm record with both sides contains two songs.

Track listing

Personnel
 Abraham Mazumdar – vocals, piano, violin
 Biswanath Chattopadhyay – drums, base, violin, guitar
 Tapas Das – vocal, rhythm guitar
 Gautam Chattopadhyay – vocals, lead, acoustic guitar, saxophone
 Pradip Chatterjee – vocals, base
 Tapesh Bandyopadhyay – vocals
 Ranjon Ghoshal – vocals

Production
 Sushant Bandopadhyay – engineering
 Tarun Bagachi – acoustic assistance
 Asim Datto – acoustic assistance
 Ranjon Ghoshal – media conduct, front cover design
 Sarmistha Chatterjee – front cover design
 Sangeeta Ghoshal – front cover design

References

Citations

External links

1977 debut albums
1977 debut EPs
Bengali-language albums
Moheener Ghoraguli albums
Kolkata in popular culture